Azman Ibrahim may refer to:

 Azman Ibrahim (manager) (born 1960), Malaysian football manager
 Azman Ibrahim (politician), Malaysian politician